Signs of Infinite Power is the tenth album by the southern California stoner rock band Fu Manchu. It was released on October 20, 2009 on Century Media Records.

Track listing

Personnel
Scott Hill – vocals, guitar
Bob Balch – guitar
Brad Davis – bass
Scott Reeder – drums

Production
Sergio Chavez – producer
Fu Manchu – producer

References

Fu Manchu (band) albums
2009 albums
Century Media Records albums